Lake Cobbosseecontee, also known as Cobbossee Lake, is a lake located in the towns of Litchfield, Manchester, Monmouth, West Gardiner, and Winthrop in the U.S. state of Maine. The word Cobbosseecontee translates to "plenty of sturgeon" in Wabanaki.

Recreation and physical characteristics 

Lake Cobbosseecontee is known for its beautifully irregular shape, which consists of numerous glacial coves, jettys, and islands. It also has the only active inland waters lighthouse in Maine, Ladies' Delight Light. Founded in 1904, the club is one of the oldest continually operating inland yacht clubs in the United States. The lighthouse marks the northern edge of a jagged underwater reef that runs down the middle of the lake. The archipelago of islands and exposed ledges are the visible high points of that reef. A state-owned public launch is located on the southwest shore of the lake in East Monmouth. Low hills and ridges surround the lake, and Monks Hill and Allen Hill rise a few miles north of the lake, while a gray line of hills form a barrier near Sabattus.

There are many year-round homes and cottages along the shoreline, with some new developments and gentrification having occurred steadily since the 1990's. The lake is home to Camp Cobbossee, Camp Kippewa, Pilgrim Lodge, and the YMCA Camp of Maine.

Water quality
Between the 1960's and the early 2000's, Lake Cobbosseecontee's water quality was impaired by severe algae blooms and murky water clarity during the hot summer months, both of which impacted recreation and fish populations quite extensively. However, several cleanup efforts began to surface in the 1970's, likely inspired in part by the EPA's Clean Water Act. A few decades later, the actions had proven successful, and Cobbosseecontee's water quality rapidly improved throughout the 90's and 2000's as phosphorus runoff decreased and the natural springs that feed the lake began to "flush out" many of the remaining pollutants. , Cobboseecontee's water quality rivaled that of other clearwater lakes, with many boaters able to see over  down, on occasion.

Fishing

The lake is nationally recognized as one of the top bass-fishing lakes in America, mostly due to its impressive largemouth population. Many of Maine's largest and most aggressive bass come from Cobbosseecontee.  There are also many other different types of popular fish that you can find in Cobbosseecontee, which include brook trout, brown trout, rainbow smelt, white perch, yellow perch, bullheads, sunfish and crappie. A popular bass fishing technique on Cobbosseecontee involves casting or slowly trolling around the lake's numerous islands, coves, and ledges.

References

External links

Cobbosseecontee Yacht Club
Horseshoe Island Preserve
Lakes of Maine Overview
Survey and Map from State of Maine
Winthrop Lakes Region Chamber of Commerce
Maine Fishing Locations Overview

Lakes of Kennebec County, Maine
Winthrop, Maine
Manchester, Maine
Reservoirs in Maine